The timeline below details the ongoing investigation into the September 11, 2012 attack upon the American diplomatic mission at Benghazi, in Libya. The attack and the investigation are the subject of much controversy in the American political sphere.

Timeline

September 2012

October 2012

November 2012

December 2012

January 2013

February 2013

April 2013

May 2013

August 2013

2014

2015

2016

References

External links
100 pages of emails released by the White House on May 15, 2013 at CNN
H. Rept. 114-848 - . FINAL REPORT OF THE SELECT COMMITTEE ON THE EVENTS SURROUNDING THE 2012 TERRORIST ATTACK IN BENGHAZI at U.S. Government Publishing Office

2012 Benghazi attack
Investigation into the 2012 Benghazi attack